Lily Bay State Park is a public recreation area in the town of Greenville, Piscataquis County, Maine. The state park occupies  on the southeast shore of Moosehead Lake, the largest lake in New England. It was established in 1961 on woodland primarily donated by the Scott Paper Company in 1959. The park offers camping, boating, fishing, swimming, and snowmobiling. A two-mile trail used for hiking, snowshoeing, and cross-country skiing follows the shore of the lake.

The park is 1 of 5 Maine State Parks that are in the path of totality for the 2024 solar eclipse, with 3 minutes and 14 seconds of totality.

References

External links
Lily Bay State Park Department of Agriculture, Conservation and Forestry
Lily Bay State Park Guide & Map Department of Agriculture, Conservation and Forestry

State parks of Maine
North Maine Woods
Protected areas of Piscataquis County, Maine
Beaches of Maine
Hiking trails in Maine
Campgrounds in Maine
Protected areas established in 1959
1959 establishments in Maine